Viola Valli (born 15 May 1972) is a former female open water swimmer from Italy. She is the former world champion at the 5 km, 10 km and 25 km open water distance.

International medals
She won 12 medals (8 individual) at the World Open Water Swimming Championships.

See also
 World Open Water Championships - Multiple medalists

References

External links
 Viola Valli profile at Les-sports 
 Viola Valli official website 
 BBC News Article on Viola

1972 births
Living people
Sportspeople from Varese
Italian female swimmers
World Aquatics Championships medalists in open water swimming
Italian female long-distance swimmers
Mediterranean Games medalists in swimming
Mediterranean Games bronze medalists for Italy
Swimmers at the 1997 Mediterranean Games